Haidingerite is a calcium arsenate mineral with formula Ca(AsO3OH)·H2O. It crystallizes in the orthorhombic crystal system as short prismatic to equant
crystals. It typically occurs as scaly, botryoidal or fibrous coatings. It is soft, Mohs hardness of 2 to 2.5, and has a specific gravity of 2.95. It has refractive indices of nα = 1.590, nβ = 1.602 and nγ = 1.638.

It was originally discovered in 1827 in Jáchymov, Czech Republic. It was named to honor Austrian mineralogist Wilhelm Karl Ritter von Haidinger (1795–1871). It occurs as a dehydration product of pharmacolite in the Getchell Mine, Nevada.

See also
 List of minerals named after people

References

 Palache, C., H. Berman, and C. Frondel (1951) Dana’s system of mineralogy, (7th edition), v. II, pp.708–709.

Calcium minerals
Arsenate minerals
Orthorhombic minerals
Minerals in space group 60